Indigenous religion in Zimbabwe is explained in terms of the Zimbabwe ethnic groups, beliefs, norms and values, rites and rituals, ceremonies and celebrations. Indigenous religion is more carried out by living it than with its theory. Religion among the Africans is very important, it plays a vital role for the individuals, the family and the community as a whole. Bourdlillon asserts that indigenous religion is one, though there can be various manifestation just like Christianity which is one but has various denominations. Thomas Gale defined the word indigenous as to anything that is native to a particular geographical culture. Mbiti says in Zimbabwe Indigenous religion is in two classes, the Ndebele and Shona. However, Zimbabwe has a lot of minority tribes including the Tonga, Venda, Kalanga and Sothu.

Characteristics of Indigenous Religion

The existence of spirits 

In indigenous religion, the activities and actions of Spirits govern all social and spiritual phenomena.

The Shona and Ndebele people believe that spirits are everywhere, spirits coexist with people.

Belief in God 
Zimbabweans believe in God the Supreme Being who is referred to by many names depending on the tribe and occasion. Ndebele call him, uNkulunkulu, uThixo, uMdali or uMvelinqangi. The Shona call him Mwari ,  Ishe,Musikavanhu

Belief in life after death 
It is believed that when one dies, he/she lives on and can still hear and make decisions on life thus taking an ancestral form living in the world of the spirits. There is communication between the dead and the living, whom the living believe to be their guardians in life.

Ancestral Spirits 
An ancestor is any person from whom one is a descendant.

In indigenous religion, ancestors are appeased during hard times so the ancestors help them. Their Duties

 They are regarded as good and important
 They are protectors of people, land (territorial spirits)
 intermediates between people and Supreme being
 They do not cause harm
 Fight evil spirits away from their family
 Influence proper moral behavior
 Guide the living

Sacred places 

There are a lot of these places in Zimbabwe. It is a place where the spirits dwell. These are holy, godly or divine and highly respected places. They are significant because that is where the sacred practitioner communicates with the ancestors. These can be a hill, caves, rivers, trees and mountains. Examples include Njelele, Gulabahwe Cave, Silozwana caves, Diana's pool and Chinhoyi Caves.

Ceremonies 

 Rain making ceremony
 Umbuyiso
Ukuthethela

It is orally transmitted 
There is no scripture or sacred text. These are transmitted orally; by word of mouth from one generation to the other.

Moral Code 
The indigenous religion has a strong moral code based on the sacredness of other being. Failure to adhere to the moral code has strong repercussions in the afterlife. Respect for elders and honoring parents is one of the adhered to moral code. Killing, witchcraft, stealing, injuring others are some of the forbidden things through the moral code.

The concept of Ubuntu means that a human being cannot exist as a human being in isolation.(Louw, 1998)

Historical spirit mediums
Mbuya Nehanda
Sekuru Kaguvi
Sekemutema
kawanzaruwa

References 

Blessing Makonese(June 2022)

Further reading

Traditional African religions
Religion in Zimbabwe